The Democratic Union was a coalition of seven Greek political parties for the elections of 1956.

Its main leader was Georgios Papandreou. Members of the coalition were:
 Liberal Democratic Union;
 Liberal Party;
 United Democratic Left (EDA);
 National Progressive Center Union (EPEK);
 People's Party;
 Democratic Party of Working People;
 Peasants and Workers Party (KAE).

Liberal parties in Greece
Defunct political party alliances in Greece
1950s in Greek politics
Political parties established in 1956
1956 establishments in Greece
Political parties disestablished in 1957
1957 disestablishments in Greece
Centrist parties in Greece